Sabila Nur ( born 27 May 1995), is a Bangladeshi Actress and Model. She became popular as "The Imaginary Girl" in the romantic comedy telefilm Monkey Bizness (2015). She is well known for her bright appearance in Bengali TV dramas and many TVC. She made her debut with the telefilm U-Turn in 2014.

Early life and background  
Sabila was born in Patiya, Chittagong, Bangladesh. From early childhood she was fond of dancing. She learned dancing from Bulbul Lalitakala Academy. She got her Bachelor of Arts in English degree from the American International University-Bangladesh.

Career
Sabila started her career by modeling for the country's largest telecom company, Grameenphone. She is the host of Gazi TV's competition on teen bands, GTV Fanta Band. She is also the host of Lux Style fine on Banglavision. Now Sabila Nur is brand ambassador of Glow & Lovely.

Television

Films 
 Mujib: The Making of a Nation (2022)

Short film
 Chesra Premik
 Voice of Love (2017)
 Polayon Biddya (2017)
 The Knock (2020)
 Bondings (2021)
 700 Taka (2021)
 Short Cut Series (Emon Jodi Hoto) (2021)
 Ke Kokhon Kivabe (Hot Patties) (2021)

Documentary

TV commercials
 Grameen Phone
 Nescafe
 Regent Airlines
 Singer Corporation
 Maasranga Television
 Igloo Ice Cream
 Asian Town
 Detos Chips
 Robi
 Oppo
 bKash

Awards and nominations

References

External links

Place of birth missing (living people)
Living people
21st-century Bangladeshi actresses
Bangladeshi television actresses
American International University-Bangladesh alumni
North South University alumni
People from Dhaka
1995 births